Punchy Cowpunchers is a 1950 short subject directed by Edward Bernds starring American slapstick comedy team The Three Stooges (Moe Howard, Larry Fine and Shemp Howard). It is the 120th entry in the series released by Columbia Pictures starring the comedians, who released 190 shorts for the studio between 1934 and 1959.

Plot
It is the Old West and the Dillon clan are making life miserable for a small Western town. Sweetheart Nell (Christine McIntyre) sends her dashing but dimwitted boyfriend Elmer (Jock O'Mahoney) to find help. Meanwhile, in the United States Cavalry, cavalrymen the Stooges are making life miserable for their superior, Sergeant Mullins (Dick Wessel). Mullins tries to whip the boys into shape, but his plan backfires and he has a run-in with his superior, Captain Daley (Emil Sitka). Before that goes far, the Colonel informs Mullins about the Dillon clan's evildoings, and needs some men to run them out of town. Mullins does not miss a beat, and volunteers the unsuspecting Stooges.

The trio are made up to look like tough desperadoes, and happen upon the town saloon. They take jobs as waiters and do their best to spy on Dillon (Kenneth MacDonald) and his hombres without being discovered (complete with fake mustaches) However, Moe's mustache flies off his face, right onto Dillon's nose. The gang tie up Moe and Larry, and manage to corner Shemp into a safe.

As this is going on, Elmer is stumbling his way to the door of United States Cavalry, who are temporarily unavailable, it being pay day and all ("Boys will be boys," shrugs Cavalry colonel Vernon Dent). Disillusioned, Elmer returns to rescue his Nell, who is busy knocking every cowboy who enters her room out cold. Eventually, the Stooges emerge victorious.

Cast

Credited

Production notes
Punchy Cowpunchers was filmed on February 7–10, 1949 at the Columbia Ranch on Stages X and W. It is one of the few entries in the Stooge canon to feature an extensive musical soundtrack. It also features all four of the core supporting actors who appeared in the majority of the team's post-Curly films: Christine McIntyre, Kenneth MacDonald, Vernon Dent and Emil Sitka.

External links 
 
 
 Punchy Cowpunchers at threestooges.net

References

1950 films
1950 comedy films
1950 short films
1950s Western (genre) comedy films
American Western (genre) comedy films
American black-and-white films
Columbia Pictures short films
Films directed by Edward Bernds
The Three Stooges films
Western (genre) cavalry films
1950s English-language films
1950s American films